Video 2000 (also known as V2000, with the tape standard Video Compact Cassette, or VCC) is a consumer videocassette system and analogue recording standard developed by Philips and Grundig to compete with JVC's VHS and Sony's Betamax video technologies. It was designed for the PAL color television standard, but some models additionally handled SECAM. Distribution of Video 2000 products began in 1979 exclusively in Europe, South Africa and Argentina and ended in 1988.

Although some initial models and advertising featured a mirror-image "VCR" badge based on the logo of Philips's earlier Video Cassette Recording (VCR) system, Video 2000 was an entirely new (and incompatible) format, which incorporated many technical innovations. Despite this, the format was not a major success and was eventually discontinued, having lost out to the rival VHS system in the videotape format war.

The Video Compact Cassette 
Philips named the videotape standard Video Compact Cassette (VCC) to complement its landmark audio Compact Cassette format introduced in 1963, but the format itself was marketed under the trademark Video 2000.

Despite the name, VCCs are marginally larger than VHS cassettes—shorter, but thicker and deeper. They have two co-planar reels containing half-inch (12.5 mm) wide chromium dioxide magnetic tape. The format used only half (6.25 mm) of the half-inch tape on a given "side", and so it is occasionally referred to erroneously as a quarter-inch tape format, despite its physical tape width. The cassette can then be flipped over to use the other half of the tape, thus doubling playing time.

Format and features
Dynamic Track Following (DTF) eliminated the need for a separate control track and enabled the video heads to accurately follow the recorded tracks on the tape during playback. Therefore, by design V2000 machines do not require a video tracking control.

Launch 

A key intention of the V2000 format, thanks to DTF, was tape compatibility. A tape from any machine should play perfectly on any other machine. Unfortunately, when the VR2020 reached the shops it was discovered that its audio head was 2.5mm out of position compared to that on Grundig's Video 2×4. This meant that the sound would be out of sync with the picture when played back on the other type of machine. Both manufacturers' production lines hastily moved the audio head 1.25mm to a common position, but compatibility issues remained for recordings made on the first generation of machines.

Machines 

 Philips VR2026 (PAL/SECAM tuner—recorded SECAM as PAL)

References

External links

 Video 2000 page at Total Rewind—The Virtual Museum of Vintage VCRs
 V2000 PALsite—Information about the V2000 video format
 "Europe's Video Recorder Takes on the Japanese", New Scientist July, 5, 1979, page 25

1988 disestablishments
Audiovisual introductions in 1979
Discontinued media formats
Philips
Products introduced in 1979
Videotape